Maria II Zaccaria (14th century – after 1404) was a Princess of Achaia.  

She was daughter of Centurione I Zaccaria, Lord of Veligosti–Damala and Chalandritsa. She succeeded her spouse Pedro de San Superano in 1402 as regent for their son. In 1404, she ceded the regency to her nephew, Centurione II Zaccaria.

References

Sources
 
 
 
 

14th-century births
15th-century deaths
Maria
Maria
Maria
14th-century women
15th-century women rulers
14th-century people from the Principality of Achaea
15th-century people from the Principality of Achaea